Labeo boga is fish in genus Labeo. It is in the family Cyprinidae and the Actinopterygii class which is widespread in India, Nepal, Bangladesh, Pakistan and Myanmar.

References

External links 
 

Labeo
Fish of Bangladesh
Fish described in 1822